Victor Firea (16 March 1923 – 25 May 2007) was a Romanian middle-distance runner. He competed in the men's 3000 metres steeplechase at the 1952 Summer Olympics.

References

1923 births
2007 deaths
Athletes (track and field) at the 1952 Summer Olympics
Romanian male middle-distance runners
Romanian male steeplechase runners
Olympic athletes of Romania
Place of birth missing